Coonagh Aerodrome  is located near Coonagh,  west of the city of Limerick in County Limerick (Contae Luimnigh), Ireland. This aerodrome is licensed by the Aeronautical Services Department of the Irish Aviation Authority. It is home to the Limerick Flying Club.

Facilities 

Extreme care must be taken when operating into Coonagh as the narrow runway may give the impression of a long runway. Coonagh lies very close to the Shannon CTR, just .

Aircraft 
Limerick Flying Club, based at Coonagh, currently operates three Tecnam P-2002-JF Sierra aircraft. There are also a number of privately owned aircraft based at Coonagh.

References

External links
Limerick Flying Club

Airports in the Republic of Ireland
Transport in County Limerick